The 1956 Preakness Stakes was the 81st running of the $135,000 Preakness Stakes thoroughbred horse race. The race took place on May 19, 1956, and was televised in the United States on the CBS television network. Fabius, who was jockeyed by William Hartack, won the race by one and three quarter lengths over runner-up Needles. Approximate post time was 5:46 p.m. Eastern Time. The race was run on a fast track in a final time of 1:582/5  The Maryland Jockey Club reported total attendance of 30,714, this is recorded as second highest on the list of American thoroughbred racing top attended events for North America in 1956. It was also the first year that Pimlico Race Course began recording attendance figures.

Payout 

The 81st Preakness Stakes Payout Schedule

The full chart 

 Winning Breeder: Calumet Farm; (KY)
 Winning Time: 1:58 2/5
 Track Condition: Fast
 Total Attendance: 30,714

References

External links 
 

1957
1956 in horse racing
1956 in American sports
1956 in sports in Maryland
Horse races in Maryland